Serge Blusson (7 May 1928 – 14 March 1994) was a French cyclist. He was born in Paris. He won a gold medal in the team pursuit at the 1948 Summer Olympics in London, together with Pierre Adam, Charles Coste and Fernand Decanali. He finished in fifth place in the 1954 Paris–Roubaix.

References

External links
 

1928 births
1994 deaths
Cyclists from Paris
French male cyclists
Cyclists at the 1948 Summer Olympics
Olympic cyclists of France
Olympic gold medalists for France
Olympic medalists in cycling
Medalists at the 1948 Summer Olympics
French track cyclists